Pterothrissus gissu, also known as the Japanese gissu, is a species of ray-finned fish in the family Albulidae. The Japanese gissu is a rare fish that is distributed in deep water off northwest Pacific Ocean. This fish is known to pass through a leptocephalus larval stage, but only metamorphosed (after reaching the fully grown stage) specimens have been available. This species is the only member of its genus.

References

Japanese gissu
Fish of Japan
Taxa named by Franz Martin Hilgendorf
Japanese gissu